The Topock Fire (known as the Pirate Fire in California) was a fire that burned in Arizona and California, and was named for nearby Topock, Arizona.

References

External links 
 Information on the fire

Wildfires in Arizona
Wildfires in San Bernardino County, California
2016 in Arizona
2016 California wildfires